Abu Muhammad 'Abdallah ibn Muhammad ibn Hajjaj ibn al-Yasmin al-Adrini al-Fessi (died 1204) more commonly known as ibn al-Yasmin, was a Berber mathematician, born in Morocco and he received his education in Fez and Sevilla. Little is known of his personal life, except that he was born into an Berber family. and according to Ibn Sa'id, he was black like his mother. Since some historians have given him the surname al-Ishbili, he may have been born or grown up in Seville. Besides mathematics, he also became famous in literature, law, and particularly in Andalusian poetry.

Works 
His most important work is Talqih al-afkar bi rushum huruf al-ghubar (Fertilization of Thoughts with the Help of Dust Letters (Western Arabic Numerals)). It is a book of two hundred folios about (among other things) the science of calculation and geometry. He also wrote three poems (urzaja), one on algebra, one on irrational quadratic numbers, and one on the method of false position.

References

Moroccan writers
Berber Moroccans
Berber writers
Medieval Moroccan mathematicians
Berber scientists
12th-century mathematicians
1204 deaths
13th-century Moroccan people
12th-century Moroccan people
Year of birth unknown
12th-century Berber people
13th-century Berber people